"Waltz Me to Heaven" is a song written by Dolly Parton, and recorded by American country music artist Waylon Jennings.  It was released in January 1985 as the second single from his compilation album Waylon's Greatest Hits, Vol. 2.  The song reached number 10 on the Billboard Hot Country Singles & Tracks chart.

Chart performance

References

1985 singles
Dolly Parton songs
Waylon Jennings songs
Songs written by Dolly Parton
RCA Records singles
1985 songs